This is a list of independent wrestling promotions in the United States, sorted by regional area, and lists both active and defunct "indy promotions" from the 1990s and 2000s. This list does not include the regional territories or promotions affiliated with the National Wrestling Alliance.

There is no concrete definition on what constitutes an independent promotion. A general guideline would be that an independent promotion, as its name suggests, has no corporate sponsor or ownership providing funding for its operation. For example, Ring of Honor is owned by Tony Khan and Impact Wrestling is a subsidiaries of Anthem Sports, so they fall outside this definition. Another guideline would be a restriction, either by choice or by financial or logistical circumstances, to a particular geographic area, be it a state, a metropolitan area, or even a single town or arena.

Of lesser consideration is the promotion's fanbase. Fan attendance at live shows can be a factor, but is by no means a definite consideration. Most shows hosted by independent promotions have attendances anywhere from under fifty to a thousand or more, but Extreme Championship Wrestling in its heyday in the 1990s regularly hosted events of several thousand fans. Media exposure is also considered. Most independent promotions have very limited television exposure, if any, as they lack equipment or infrastructure to produce broadcast-quality programming. None have had any national television contract since ECW in the late 1990s. The most successful televised promotions release shows as syndicated programming, aired by one or several network affiliates in their local area.

New England

Connecticut

Massachusetts

New Hampshire

Rhode Island

East Coast

Delaware

Maryland

New Jersey

New York

Pennsylvania

Midwest

Illinois

Indiana

Iowa

Kansas

Michigan

Minnesota

Missouri

Ohio

Southeast

Florida

Georgia

Kentucky

North Carolina

Tennessee

Virginia

West Virginia

South Central

Texas

West

California

Nevada

Oregon

Utah

References

Independent wrestling promotions in the United States